Arabi is a domesticated breed of fat-tailed sheep from southwestern Iran, southern Iraq and northeastern Arabia and Egypt.  Though it does grow wool, it is primarily raised for meat.

Characteristics
The Arabi rams have horns and the ewes are polled (hornless).  This breed is the foundation stock for the Wooled Persian of South Africa.

It is highly likely that the Arabi is descended from very ancient importations from Arabia across the narrow Bal-el-Mandeb Straits at the mouth of the Red Sea. This breed has adapted to extreme temperatures and conditions. From 1990 to 2000, the population of the Arabi increased from 1.4 million to 1.5 million.

The Arabi is usually white; however, black, brown and black-and-brown can occur. The wool has an average diameter of 26.2 micrometres. On average, slightly more than one lamb is produced per litter.

References

Sheep breeds originating in Iraq
Sheep breeds originating in Iran